Boerum Hill Historic District is a national historic district in Boerum Hill, Brooklyn, New York, New York.  It originally consisted of 238 contributing residential rowhouses and a few commercial buildings built between 1845 and 1890.  Most are three bay, three story brick buildings with projecting stoops in a Greek Revival or Italianate style.

It was listed on the National Register of Historic Places in 1983. Its area was approximately doubled in 2018.

References

External links

National Historic District summary  at Trust for Architectural Easements
National Register of Historic Places Historic District Designation Report at Trust for Architectural Easements
District map
District map, as expanded in 2018

Italianate architecture in New York City
Greek Revival architecture in New York City
Boerum Hill
Historic districts on the National Register of Historic Places in Brooklyn
New York City designated historic districts
New York City Designated Landmarks in Brooklyn